Marie-Lou Marcel (born 21 August 1953) was a member of the National Assembly of France.  She represented Aveyron's 2nd constituency from 2007 to 2017, as a member of the Socialiste, radical, citoyen et divers gauche.

References

External links
 Page on the National Assembly web site
 Official web page

1953 births
Living people
Women members of the National Assembly (France)
Deputies of the 13th National Assembly of the French Fifth Republic
Deputies of the 14th National Assembly of the French Fifth Republic
21st-century French women politicians
Members of Parliament for Aveyron